The 1794 United States House of Representatives elections in New York were held on December 12, 1794, to elect ten United States Representatives to represent the State of New York in the United States House of Representatives of the 4th United States Congress.

Background
Ten U.S. Representatives had been elected in January 1793 to a term in the 3rd United States Congress beginning on March 4, 1793. One representative, Silas Talbot (10th D.), had accepted in June 1794 an appointment to the United States Navy, and thus vacated his seat. No special election was called to fill the vacancy. The other nine representatives' term would end on March 3, 1795.

Congressional districts
On January 27, 1789, the New York State Legislature had divided the State of New York into six congressional districts which were not numbered. On December 18, 1792, the Legislature divided the State into ten districts, which were still not numbered, taking into account the new counties created in 1791. The congressional districts remained at this election the same as at the previous election, only inside the Tenth District a new county, Onondaga, was created in 1794.
One district (later back-numbered as the 1st) comprising Kings, Queens and Suffolk counties.
One district (later back-numbered as the 2nd) comprising New York County.
One district (later back-numbered as the 3rd) comprising Westchester and Richmond counties.
One district (later back-numbered as the 4th) comprising Orange and Ulster counties.
One district (later back-numbered as the 5th) comprising Dutchess County.
One district (later back-numbered as the 6th) comprising Columbia County.
One district (later back-numbered as the 7th) comprising Clinton and Rensselaer counties.
One district (later back-numbered as the 8th) comprising Albany County.
One district (later back-numbered as the 9th) comprising Washington and Saratoga counties.
One district (later back-numbered as the 10th) comprising Montgomery, Ontario, Herkimer, Otsego, Tioga and Onondaga counties.

Note: There are now 62 counties in the State of New York. The counties which are not mentioned in this list had not yet been established, or sufficiently organized, the area being included in one or more of the abovementioned counties.

Result
6 Democratic-Republicans and 4 Federalists were elected. Thomas Tredwell, the incumbent from the 1st District, had moved to Plattsburgh and ran for re-election in the 7th District, but was defeated by the local incumbent John E. Van Alen. Of the other incumbents, Watts was defeated; Glen, Gilbert, Bailey and Van Cortlandt were re-elected; and Peter Van Gaasbeck and James Gordon did not run for re-election.

Note: The Anti-Federalists called themselves "Republicans." However, at the same time, the Federalists called them "Democrats" which was meant to be pejorative. After some time both terms got more and more confused, and sometimes used together as "Democratic Republicans" which later historians have adopted (with a hyphen) to describe the party from the beginning, to avoid confusion with both the later established and still existing Democratic and Republican parties.

Aftermath
The House of Representatives of the 4th United States Congress met for the first time at Congress Hall in Philadelphia on December 7, 1795, and nine of the ten representatives took their seats on this day. Only John Hathorn arrived late, and took his seat on December 17.

Notes

Sources
The New York Civil List compiled in 1858 (see: pg. 65 for district apportionment; pg. 68 for Congressmen)
Members of the Fourth United States Congress
Election result 1st D. at Tufts University Library project "A New Nation Votes"
Election result 2nd D. at Tufts University Library project "A New Nation Votes"
Election result 3rd D. at Tufts University Library project "A New Nation Votes"
Election result 4th D. at Tufts University Library project "A New Nation Votes"
Election result 5th D. at Tufts University Library project "A New Nation Votes"
Election result 6th D. at Tufts University Library project "A New Nation Votes"
Election result 7th D. at Tufts University Library project "A New Nation Votes"
Election result 8th D. at Tufts University Library project "A New Nation Votes"
Election result 9th D. at Tufts University Library project "A New Nation Votes"
Election result 10th D. at Tufts University Library project "A New Nation Votes"

1794
New York
United States House of Representatives